Milan Airport may refer to any of these airports serving Milan, Italy:

 Malpensa Airport – the main international airport
 Linate Airport – a smaller airport for domestic and European services
 Il Caravaggio International Airport, near Bergamo – another airport for domestic and European services
 Bresso Airport – used only by general aviation